Street Cricket Champions is a backyard cricket game series released exclusively in India for PlayStation 2, PlayStation Portable, and PlayStation 3 (with PlayStation Move functionality). It was the first series of cricket games to be developed in India, by Mumbai-based studio Trine Games, as well as the first video games based on gully cricket.

The first sequel, Street Cricket Champions 2, was released on September 29, 2012 for PS2 and PSP. According to then-CEO of Trine Games, Sangam Gupta, this sequel was primarily a re-skin of the first game, with some bug fixes.

As the games are meant to depict amateur groups playing the game in the streets, no licensed player likenesses are featured.

A PS3 console bundle was released featuring Move Street Cricket II.

Titles
Street Cricket Champions
Street Cricket Champions 2
Move Street Cricket
Move Street Cricket II

Console bundles
Fun with Family & Friends PlayStation 2 slim model boxed with Street Cricket Champions and Ra.One: The Game
Fun with Family & Friends PlayStation 2 slim model boxed with Street Cricket Champions 2 and Don 2: The Game
Move Street Cricket II PlayStation 3 super slim 12 GB model boxed with Move Street Cricket II and PlayStation Move starter pack

See also 
 List of cricket video games

References

External links
Official website

2010 video games
Cricket video games
PlayStation 2 games
PlayStation 3 games
PlayStation Portable games
PlayStation Move-compatible games
India-exclusive video games
Video games developed in India